Coptic monasticism is said to be the original form of monasticism as St. Anthony of Egypt became the first one to be called "monk" (Gr: μοναχός) and he was the first to establish a Christian monastery which is now known as the Monastery of Saint Anthony at the base of Mount Colzim. St. Anthony's Monastery (also known as the Monastery of Abba Antonious) is the oldest Christian monastery in the world. 

Although Saint Anthony's way of life was focused on solitarity, Saint Pachomius the Cenobite, a Copt from Upper Egypt, established communal monasticism in his monasteries in upper Egypt which laid the basic monastic structure for many of the monasteries today in many monastic orders, even outside of Coptic Orthodoxy.

Origins

Institutional Christian monasticism seems to have begun in the deserts in 4th century AD Egypt as a kind of living martyrdom. Scholars such as Lester K. Little attribute the rise of monasticism at this time to the immense changes in the church that had been brought about by Constantine's acceptance of Christianity as the main Roman religion. This ended the position of Christians as a small group that believed itself to be the godly elite. In response a new more advanced form of dedication was developed to preserve a nucleus of the dedicated. The end of persecution also meant that martyrdom was no longer an option to prove one's piety. Instead the long-term "martyrdom" of the ascetic became common.

Many Egyptian Christians went to the desert during the 3rd century, and remained there to pray and work and dedicate their lives to seclusion and worship of God. This was the beginning of the monastic movement, which was organized by Anthony the Great, Saint Paul, the world's first anchorite, Saint Macarius the Great and Saint Pachomius the Cenobite in the 4th century.

St. Pachomius

Pachomius established his first monastery between 318 and 323 at Tabennisi, Egypt, and when it grew too large, his second one, Pabau monastery, was built in Faou. Pachomius spent most of his time at Pabau. By the time of his death in 345, one count estimates there were 3000 monasteries dotting Egypt from north to south. Within a generation after his death, this number grew to 7000 and then expanding out of Egypt into Palestine and the Judea Desert, Syria, North Africa and eventually Western Europe.

Monasticism

Christian monasticism was born in Egypt and was instrumental in the formation of the Coptic Orthodox Church character of submission, simplicity and humility, thanks to the teachings and writings of the Great Fathers of Egypt's Deserts. By the end of the 5th century, there were hundreds of monasteries, and thousands of cells and caves scattered throughout the Egyptian desert. A great number of these monasteries are still flourishing and have new vocations to this day.

All Christian monasticism stems, either directly or indirectly, from the Egyptian example: Saint Basil the Great Archbishop of Caesaria of Cappadocia, founder and organizer of the monastic movement in Asia Minor, visited Egypt around 357 AD and his rule is followed by the Eastern Orthodox Churches; Saint Jerome who translated the Bible into Latin, came to Egypt, while en route to Jerusalem, around 400 AD and left details of his experiences in his letters; Benedict founded the Benedictine Order in the 6th century on the model of Saint Pachomius, but in a stricter form. Countless pilgrims have visited the "Desert Fathers" to emulate their spiritual, disciplined lives.

The Coptic monasticism took three forms:
 Monachism 
 The coenobitic system
 The communal System or semi-eremitic Life

Modern status
The Coptic Orthodox Church has many monasteries and convents that host many monks and nuns. All of the Coptic bishops are chosen from monks, although this was not necessary traditionally.

Coptic monasticism saw a revival that started in the 1960s during the papacy of Pope Cyril VI of Alexandria, and currently there are Coptic monasteries and convents in Egypt, the United States, Australia and Europe that have been recognized by the Holy Synod of the Coptic Orthodox Church.

There are currently 33 monasteries in Egypt and in the lands of the immigration with a total of more than 1,000 monks, and six convents with about 300 nuns. The largest monasteries, and most famous, are at Wadi Natrun, about 60 miles northwest of Cairo. They are the only four of the ancient fortified self-sufficient monasteries which have survived out of many that were in the Wadi Natroun valley.

Image gallery

See also
Christian monasticism before 451
The Daughters of St. Mary
Desert Fathers
Eastern Christian monasticism
List of Coptic monasteries
Members of the Covenant
Parabalani
Tall Brothers
Matta El Meskeen
Chronology of early Christian monasticism

References

Further reading 
Gabra, Gawdat. 2010. Coptic Monasteries: Egypt's Monastic Art and Architecture. University of Cairo Press. 
Gruber, Mark. 2003. Sacrifice In the Desert: A Study of an Egyptian Minority Through the Lens of Coptic Monasticism. Lanham: University Press of America. 

Coptic Christianity